SIC K is a Portuguese television channel aimed at children aged 7–14. This channel is owned by Sociedade Independente de Comunicação (SIC), it was launched on 18 December 2009 on the MEO platform. The channel previously had an exclusivity contract with the provider for six months. It stopped being a MEO exclusive when it became available on Vodafone on March 24, 2016, Nowo on December 19, 2016 and NOS on June 25, 2019. On December 22. 2021 on Film

Programming

Bleach
Blue Water High (Mar Azul) (also on SIC)
Ben 10 (also on SIC and Cartoon Network)
Ben 10: Alien Force (also on SIC and Cartoon Network)
Wallace & Gromit
Lego Hero Factory
Oggy and the Cockroaches (Oggy)
Sky Dancers (Dançarinos do Céu) (formerly on SIC and Canal Panda)
Titeuf (formerly on 2: and also on Panda Biggs/Biggs and RTP2)
Zorro: Generation Z (Zorro: Geração Z)
Mr. Bean (O Imparável Mr. Bean) (formerly on RTP1 as "Mr. Bean em Série Animada" and now on Boomerang as "Mr. Bean")
Chaotic (also on SIC and Panda Biggs)
Salve-se Quem Puder (also on SIC)
Leite Night (Late Night)
Yu-Gi-Oh! (formerly on SIC)
Yu-Gi-Oh! GX (formerly on SIC)
Yu-Gi-Oh! 5D's
Yu-Gi-Oh! Zexal
Yu-Gi-Oh! Arc-V
A Cozinha do Chef André
Factor K
Gormiti (also on SIC and Canal Panda)
Floribella (formerly on SIC and Disney Channel)
The Adventures of Hello Kitty & Friends (Hello Kitty e os Amigos)
Go-S TV (also on SIC Radical)
Unbeatable Banzuke (Unbeatable Banzuke: Todos ao Molho) (also on SIC Radical)
Trapped (Trapped: Presos na Ilha)
Polly Pocket 
Naruto (also on SIC, SIC Radical and Animax)
Hero Elementary  Escola Primária de Heróis
Horseland (also on SIC)
Escape from Scorpion Island (A Ilha do Escorpião)
Fairy Tail (also on SIC Radical)
Legend of the Dragon (A Lenda do Dragão)
Angel's Friends
Learn English with Anna (Aprender Inglês com Anna)
Roswell Conspiracies: Aliens, Myths and Legends (As Conspirações de Roswell)
Barbie: I Can Be (Barbie: Eu Quero Ser)
Bratz
I Dream (Escola de Talentos)
Fábrika
Ídolos (also on SIC)
Iron Man
Iron Kid
Kong
G2G: Got to Go! (Madisson Online)
Magnífica Micaela
The Amazing Spiez! (Mini-Espiões) (also on SIC)
One Minute in a Museum (Museu Divertido)
My Games (MyGames) (also on SIC Radical)
Genie in the House (O Génio lá de Casa)
The Magician (O Mágico)
Planeta Energia
Rebelde Way (formerly on SIC)
Lua Vermelha (also on SIC)
Yellow Woodpecker Ranch (Sítio do Picapau Amarelo) (formerly on SIC)
Split (Split: Amores Divididos)
The Nanny (The Nanny: Competente e Descarada)
Wolverine and the X-Men (Wolverine e os X-Men) (also on Panda Biggs)
XXS - Extra Extra Small (XXS)
Smurfs
Dragon Ball GT (formerly on SIC, SIC Gold and SIC Radical)
Galactik Football (Futebol Galáctico) (formerly on SIC)
Fullmetal Alchemist: Brotherhood (also on SIC Radical)
Jackie Chan Adventures (As Aventuras de Jackie Chan) (formerly on TVI)
Merlin (As Aventuras de Merlin) (also on SIC Radical)
Inspector Gadget (formerly on Canal 1, SIC, Canal Panda and KidsCo)
Dragon Ball Z (formerly on SIC, SIC Radical and SIC Gold)
Puppy in My Pocket (also on SIC)
Astro Boy (Astroboy)
I.N.K. Invisible Network Of Kids (INK – Os Incríveis Invisíveis)
Power Stone (As Pedras Mágicas) (formerly on SIC)
Tracey McBean
Martha Speaks (Marta Fala) (formerly on RTP2)
Curious George (George, o Curioso) (also on TVI)
Wild Kratts (Os manos Kratts) (also on SIC)
Sabrina: The Animated Series (Sabrina, a Bruxinha) (formerly on Disney Channel and KidsCo)
The New Woody Woodpecker Show (Pica-Pau) (also on TVI)
El Chavo Animado (O Xavier)
Kappa Mikey (formerly on Nickelodeon)
Kaijudo
Magi-Nation (also on Panda Biggs)
Cédric (Celso) (formerly on RTP2)
RollBots (Rolabôs) (formerly on RTP2)
Darker than Black (formerly on SIC Radical)
Inspector Rex (Rex, o Cão Polícia) (also on SIC)
Trollz
Maya the Bee (Abelha Maia) (formerly on RTP1)
The Adventures of Tintin (Tintim) (formerly on Canal Panda and RTP2)
Kabuto Borg
Blade (Marvel Anime)
Saint Seiya Omega (also on Biggs)
Ultimate Spider-Man (also on SIC)
Avengers Assemble (Os Vingadores Unidos da Marvel) (also on SIC)
Hulk and the Agents of S.M.A.S.H. (Hulk e os Agentes de S.M.A.S.H.) (also on SIC)
Transformers: Rescue Bots (Transformers: Heróis de Resgate) (also on JimJam)
Dragon Ball (formerly on SIC, SIC Radical and SIC Gold)
Wakfu
Wingin' It (Asas Para Que Te Quero)
Animalia (Animália) (formerly on RTP2 and Canal Panda)
Ginga e Kickoff!! (Victory Kickoff: Pontapé de Saída)
Max's Adventures (Atlantos)
Barbie: Life in the Dreamhouse
Conta-Me Uma História
Monica's Gang (Mónica e Amigos) (formerly on RTP2 and RTP Açores as Turma da Mónica)
Pac-Man and the Ghostly Adventures (Pac-Man e as Aventuras Fantasmagóricas) (also on SIC and Biggs)
Invizimals
Power Rangers: RPM
Power Rangers Jungle Fury
Power Rangers Ninja Steel
Pound Puppies (Pound Puppies - Cães Geniais) (also on SIC)
Sidekick
Grojband (also on Cartoon Network)
Looped
The Little Prince (O Principezinho) (also on RTP2)
The Avengers: Earth's Mightiest Heroes (Os Vingadores: Os Heróis Mais Poderosos da Terra) (also on SIC)
Uma Aventura (formerly on Disney Channel and also on SIC)
Dance!
Lego Ninjago: Masters of Spinjitzu (Lego Ninjago)
Max Adventures (As Aventuras do Max) (formerly on Canal Panda, RTP2 and SIC)
Nerds and Monsters (Nerds e Monstros)
Capeta
Yakkity Yak
Viva Piñata (formerly on SIC)
Z-Squad
Jurassic Cubs
Little People (also on Canal Panda)
Teo (formerly on RTP2)
Morph Files
Marsupilami
Monster High (also on Disney Channel)
The Daltons (also on SIC and RTP2)
Dark Oracle (Os Mistérios do Oráculo)
Grossology (Os Caça-Gosmas) (also on Biggs)
Chaplin & Co (Chaplin) (also on RTP2)
Wizards vs Aliens
Leon (also on RTP2)
Isa TK+
Viper's Creed
Kurozuka (novel)
Sonic Boom (also on SIC)
Dragon Ball Super (formerly on SIC and SIC Radical and also on Biggs)'
Julius Jr. (formerly on SIC)
Nature Cat (O Gato Aventureiro)
Mako Mermaids (H2O, A Ilha de Mako or Sereias de Mako) (also on SIC)
Zip Zip
The Cat in the Hat Knows a Lot About That! (O Gato da Cartola) (also on RTP2)
The New Adventures of Lassie (Lassie) (also on SIC)
Monk Little Dog (Monk) (also on Biggs)
Rock Lee & His Ninja Pals (Naruto Rock Lee)
Guardians of the Galaxy (Os Guardiões da Galáxia) (also on SIC)
H2O: Mermaid Adventures (H2O: Aventuras de Sereias) (formerly on SIC)
Four and a Half Friends (Quatro Amigos e Meio)
Aliados (formerly on SIC)
Digimon Fusion (also on Biggs and SIC)
The Davincibles (Davincibles) (formerly on Canal Panda)
Casper's Scare School (Casper, o Fanstasminha) (formerly on Disney Channel)
Sam Fox: Extreme Adventures (Sam Fox: Aventuras Extremas) (formerly on SIC)Tobot (Tobots) (formerly on SIC)The Super Hero Squad Show (O Esquadrão dos Super-Heróis) (formerly on Nickelodeon)Power Battle Race CarRated A for Awesome (A de Alucinante) (formerly on Disney Channel and SIC)
Secret WarsEverybody Loves A Moose (Toda A Gente Gosta de Alces)Ready Jet Go!Águila Roja (Águia Vermelha) (also on SIC Radical and formerly on SIC)Los Protegidos (Os Protegidos) (formerly on SIC)
CC All Stars (also on SIC Radical)Gosto Disto! (formerly on SIC)Zak StormMighty Med (Mega Med)
Supa StrikasThe Day My Butt Went Psycho! (O Dia Em Que o Meu Rabo Enlouqueceu)El Chapulín Colorado Animado (O Chapulin Colorado)Mr. Bean (previously on RTP1 and RTP Memória)Zig and Sharko (Zig e Sharko)A Kind of Magic (Uma Família Mágica) (also on SIC Internacional)Marvel's Spider-Man (Marvel's Spiderman)Chuck Chicken (Frango Chuck)Street Football (Futebol de Bairro) (formerly on RTP2 as "Clube de Rua")Counterfeit Cat (Gatastrófico)Boy Girl Dog Cat Mouse Cheese (Miúdo Miúda Cão Gato Rato Queijo)JuacasOnce (Onze or O11ZE)Física o Química (Física ou Química) (also on SIC Radical)The Kicks (As Campeãs)Gortimer Gibbon's Life on Normal Street (Um Rua Normal)Find Me in Paris (Encontra-me em Paris) (also on RTP2)Nowhere Boys (Os Rapazes do Nada) (also on RTP2)MechamatoLost in Oz'' (Perdidos em Oz)

Music videos
Music videos are also broadcast on SIC K.

Film 
Annie (2014 )

References

External links
SIC K
MEO

Portuguese-language television networks
Television networks in Portugal
Television stations in Portugal
Television channels and stations established in 2009
Sociedade Independente de Comunicação
2009 establishments in Portugal